Rico Henry Mark Lewis (born 21 November 2004) is an English professional footballer who plays as a defender for  club Manchester City.

Club career 
Lewis joined Manchester City at the age of eight and captained the club's under-18 side for the 2021–22 season. He was named on City's bench for the first time for Manchester City's first game of the 2022–23 season, and made his Premier League debut a week later, on 13 August 2022, against Bournemouth, coming on as an 82nd minute substitute for Kyle Walker.

On 5 October 2022, Lewis made his Champions League debut for Manchester City in a 5–0 win against Copenhagen, entering as a substitute for João Cancelo, a player he has been compared to. On 2 November 2022, Lewis scored his first Champions League goal in a 3–1 win against Sevilla; hence, he became the all-time youngest scorer on a first start in a Champions League match and City's youngest ever Champions League scorer, aged 17 years and 346 days. Lewis suffered racist abuse during the match from Sevilla fans.

In 2022, he was shortlisted for that year's BBC Young Sports Personality of the Year Award.

International career 
In September 2021, Lewis scored for the England under-18 team in a draw against Wales.

On 21 September 2022, Lewis made his England U19 debut during a 2–0 2023 U19 EURO qualifying win over Montenegro in Denmark.

On 17 March 2023, Lewis received his first call up to the England U21s.

Personal life 
Born in Bury, Greater Manchester, England, Lewis is of Jamaican descent. His father owns a boxing gym, and Lewis received inspiration from the boxer Muhammad Ali.

Career statistics

References

External links 
 

2004 births
Living people
Footballers from Manchester
English footballers
England youth international footballers
English sportspeople of Jamaican descent
Association football defenders
Manchester City F.C. players
Premier League players
Black British sportsmen